The killing of Kelvin Odunuyi, also known as Lampz and DipDat, occurred on 9 March 2018 outside the Vue cinema in Wood Green, London. The murder was retaliation for the death of Kwabena Nelson, a former member of the Northumberland Park Killers.

Background and death
Kelvin was the son of Afishetu Oniru; his father ran a real estate business in Nigeria. He attended Fulneck School and Heartlands High School. 

Prior to his killing, Kelvin appeared in several videos, where he rapped about stabbing and shooting opponents. However, the Evening Standard noted that there were claims that he was not involved in a gang.

Around 12:30am on 9 March 2018, a moped carrying two people drove near the Vue cinema in Wood Green. One of the occupants fired a gun at Kelvin; he was declared dead at a hospital two hours later. An article in The Telegraph noted that the death was retaliation for the death of Kwabena "Kobi" Nelson, a former member of the Northumberland Park Killers. After Kelvin's death, his DNA was found inside the car that crashed into Nelson's car.

Aftermath
Following the death of Kelvin and other Nigerian youths in the UK, Abike Dabiri, an assistant to the President of Nigeria on foreign affairs, stated that the increase of Nigerian deaths in the UK "was worrisome and disturbing." Kelvin's death was also mentioned in a song by rappers Tugga and Trills, as well as in a song by OFB rapper SJ.

A 21-year old was arrested in connection with the shooting on suspicion of murder; he was later released.

In 2021, a video showing a re-creation of Kelvin's death in a Grand Theft Auto game was described as appalling by his family.

References

2018 in London
2018 murders in the United Kingdom
2010s murders in London
March 2018 crimes in Europe
March 2018 events in the United Kingdom